Monard's dormouse (Graphiurus monardi) is a species of rodent in the family Gliridae. It is found in Angola, Democratic Republic of the Congo, and possibly Zambia. Its natural habitat is moist Central Zambezian miombo woodlands savanna.

References
Notes

Sources
Holden, M. E.. 2005. Family Gliridae. pp. 819–841 in Mammal Species of the World a Taxonomic and Geographic Reference. D. E. Wilson and D. M. Reeder eds. Johns Hopkins University Press, Baltimore.

Monard's dormouse
Rodents of Africa
Fauna of Central Africa
Monard's dormouse
Taxonomy articles created by Polbot
Central Zambezian miombo woodlands